John Addison Scott (17 Mar 1906 – 27 Dec 1986), was a decorated submarine commander during World War II who reached the rank of rear admiral in the United States Navy.

References

1906 births
1986 deaths
People from Lowell, Michigan
Military personnel from Michigan
United States Navy rear admirals (lower half)
United States Navy personnel of World War II
Recipients of the Navy Cross (United States)
United States Naval Academy alumni